Hajjiabad (also Romanized as Ḩājjīābād) is a village in Sakhvid Rural District, Nir District, Taft County, Yazd Province, Iran. At the 2006 census, its population was 66, in 17 families.

References 

Populated places in Taft County